Kenya is represented at the 2006 Commonwealth Games in Melbourne by a xx-member strong contingent comprising 102 sportspersons and xx officials.

Medals

Gold
 Augustine Choge, Athletics, Men's 5000 m
 Lucy Wangui, Athletics, Women's 10,000 m
 Alex Kipchirchir Rono, Athletics, Men's 800 m
 Ezekiel Kemboi Yano, Athletics, Men's 3000 m Steeplechase
 Janeth Jepkosgei, Athletics, Women's 800 m
 Isabella Ochichi, Athletics, Women's 5000 m

Silver
 Fred Tumbo, Athletics, Men's Marathon
 Hellen Cherono Koskei, Athletics, Women's Marathon
 Evelyne Nganga, Athletics, Women's 10,000 m
 Wesley Kiprotich Koech, Athletics, Men's 3000 m Steeplechase
 Geoffrey Kipngeno, Athletics, Men's 10,000 m

Bronze
 Benjamin Limo, Athletics, Men's 5000 m
 John Litei Nkamasiai, Athletics, Men's 800 m
 Charles James Menya, Boxing, Men's Lightweight (– 60 kg)
 Black Moses Mathenge, Boxing, Men's Light Welterweight (– 64 kg)
 Joshua Ndere Makonjio, Boxing, Men's Light Heavyweight (– 81 kg)
 Reuben Kosgei Seroney, Athletics, Men's 3000 m Steeplechase
 Lucy Wangui Kabuu, Athletics, Women's 5000 m

Results by event

Swimming
David Dunford
Nasra Nandha
Amar Shah
Ramadhan Vyombo

See also
Kenya at the 2004 Summer Olympics
Kenya at the 2008 Summer Olympics

References
thecgf

2006
Nations at the 2006 Commonwealth Games
Commonwealth Games